Kudrat Singh Meenakar (24 April 1924 – 21 March 2002) was an Indian jeweller who specialised in kundan meenakari. An artisan of Jaipur he was also known as Swarnkar, or Sunar.

Early life and education
He received training by his father under Guru Shishya Parampara, India have long tradition of Guru-shishya tradition, where skills are passed on father to son or by other relatives belonging to the same family or the same community, training the child while grooming. Kudrat Singh later went to go study at Rajasthan School of Art and Crafts, Jaipur under the new British education system at Jaipur.

Family history
His forefather was the founder of Meenakari craft at Jaipur; also his forefather was given the royal patronage by the Kacchwaha King of Amber, and Dhundhar Man Singh I, the rulers of Amber – Jaipur were not only brave and courageous but also were very efficient administrators. As administrators, they served very sincerely under different Mughal emperors and were duly acknowledged and rewarded.

Forefather of Kudrat Singh

During the 16th century his forefather was brought to Jaipore city which is now known as Jaipur city as capital of Rajasthan State, by the Kacchwaha King of Amber and Dhundhar Raja Man Singh I.

Kacchwaha King were even deputed as "Subedars" in different parts of North-West frontier and helped the emperors in running the administration
smoothly. During this time, Kudrat Singh forefather brought to Jaipore and Amber which is now known as Jaipur city as capital of Rajasthan State, from somewhere near to Lahore city situated in west Punjab,.

Familiar tradition

Children of Kudrat Singh

Inder Singh Kudrat, National Award of master craft person he also continuing the family tradition and also doing this traditional work GULAB SINGH son of Kudrat Singh.

Honours
Padma Shri
National Award

Internationally recognized
He was awarded with National Award of master craft person by Government of India in 1965.
He was awarded the Padma Shrias master craft person by Government of India in 1988.

External links 
 

20th-century engravers
Indian artisans
1924 births
2002 deaths
Recipients of the Padma Shri in arts
Indian engravers
Artists from Jaipur